The Armstrong Cork Company (formerly of Armstrong World Industries) was a cork manufacturer which was located at 2349 Railroad Street in the Strip District neighborhood of Pittsburgh, Pennsylvania.

History
The company's building was built circa 1901, and designed by architect Frederick J. Osterling.  The building was added to the National Register of Historic Places on May 10, 2005, and to the List of Pittsburgh History and Landmarks Foundation Historic Landmarks in 2007.

Today, the building is maintained as loft apartments (since May 2007), and is called "The Cork Factory " (also known as the "Cork Factory Lofts", and "The Cork Factory - loft apartments on the river").

Armstrong Cork Company eventually moved its headquarters to Lancaster, Pennsylvania. The company's product lines evolved from cork products and Linoleum, to vinyl floors and acoustical ceiling products.

References

External links

 Cork Factory Lofts at Western Pennsylvania Brownfields Center

Industrial buildings completed in 1901
Industrial buildings and structures in Pittsburgh
Industrial buildings and structures on the National Register of Historic Places in Pennsylvania
Pittsburgh History & Landmarks Foundation Historic Landmarks
National Register of Historic Places in Pittsburgh